Roots of Resistance: The Story of the Underground Railroad is a 1989 for-television documentary on the Underground Railroad.  It was produced by the Public Broadcasting Service as part of the American Experience series.

The documentary was directed by Orlando Bagwell.

References

External links
Review at The New York Times.
Roots of Resistance: The Story of the Underground Railroad at IMDB

American Experience
Works about the Underground Railroad
Documentary films about slavery in the United States
1989 films